Minkino is a rural locality (a selo) in Yurovskoye Rural Settlement, Gryazovetsky District, Vologda Oblast, Russia. The population was 4 as of 2002. There are 5 streets.

Geography 
Minkino is located 35 km northwest of Gryazovets (the district's administrative centre) by road. Tarshino is the nearest rural locality.

References 

Rural localities in Gryazovetsky District